Quinneys may refer to:

 Quinneys (novel), by the British writer Horace Annesley Vachell
 Quinneys (play), a stage version
 Quinneys (1919 film), a British film
 Quinneys (1927 film), a British film